Colonel Edward Henry Cadogan CBE (11 September 1908 – 7 February 1993) was an English first-class cricketer. Cadogan was a right-handed batsman who bowled right-arm fast.

A grandson of Edward Cadogan, a noted rower, Cadogan made his first-class debut for the Europeans against the Parsees in 1929. This was the only first-class appearance Cadogan made for the Europeans.

In 1933 Cadogan made his first-class debut Hampshire against Derbyshire. Cadogan played two first-class matches for Hampshire in 1933, the second of which came against Somerset. In the same season Cadogan made his debut for the British Army against the touring West Indians

In 1934 Cadogan represented Hampshire in two first-class matches against Middlesex and Middlesex. In the County Championship match against Middlesex, Cadogan took his maiden and only five-wicket haul with figures of 5/52.

The following season Cadogan played his final first-class match for Hampshire against the touring South Africans at the County Ground, Southampton. In his five first-class matches for Hampshire, Cadogan took 17 wickets at a bowling average of 23.82, with best figures of 5-52.

Also in the 1935 season, Cadogan made his debut for the British Army in a single first-class fixture against Cambridge University. In 1936, Cadogan played his final first-class match in the same fixture.

Cadogan fought during the Second World War, where he was injured during the Normandy campaign while serving with the Royal Welch Fusiliers. Cadogan held the rank of colonel.

Cadogan died at Lymington, Hampshire on 7 February 1993, at the age of 84.

References

External links
Edward Cadogan at Cricinfo
Edward Cadogan at CricketArchive

1908 births
1993 deaths
English cricketers
Europeans cricketers
Hampshire cricketers
British Army personnel of World War II
Royal Welch Fusiliers officers
Commanders of the Order of the British Empire
British Army cricketers
Military personnel of British India
People from Solan district